Felix Afena Ohene-Gyan (born 19 January 2003) is a Ghanaian professional footballer who plays as a forward for  club Cremonese and the Ghana national team.

Club career

Roma

Youth squad 
Born in Sunyani, Ghana, Afena-Gyan moved to Serie A side Roma's youth team on 13 March 2021, from EurAfrica FC. Just a day after being unveiled on March 13, he made an impressive debut for AS Roma's under-18 team, scoring and assisting in a 5–0 thrashing of Genoa. He then scored in his next two games for the under-18 and due to his immediate impact he was quickly promoted to Roma's Primavera under-19 squad managed by Alberto De Rossi, where he scored four and assisted two in 15 appearances to finish the season.

Starting the 2021–22 campaign well, he scored six goals in just five Primavera games to capture Mourinho's attention and earn a first-team call to train with the first team in mid-October.

First team 
Afena-Gyan was first called up to the senior team on 24 October, in Roma's Serie A game against Napoli. He made his professional debut on 27 October, against Cagliari. On 21 November, he came off the bench to score two late goals against Genoa, to give Roma a 2–0 win. The brace made him the first player born in 2003 to score in the Serie A.José Mourinho, AS Roma's manager promised to buy Afena-Gyan a pair of shoes that cost €800 if he scored a goal. After scoring, he ran to Mourinho's bench to remind him of his promise. The next morning Mourinho bought the shoes and presented it to him.

At the end of his first professional season, the Ghanaian striker played a total amount of 22 games for the Italian side, having also contributed (with three appearances) to their final victory in the opening edition of the UEFA Europa Conference League.

On 6 July 2022, he officially renewed his contract with Roma until 2026.

Cremonese 
On 29 August 2022, Afena-Gyan was signed by newly-promoted Serie A club Cremonese on a permanent deal. On 20 October, he scored his first goal for the club in a 4–2 Coppa Italia win over Modena after the extra time.

On 17 January 2023, during the match of the cup's round of 16 against Napoli, the forward scored the equalizer (2–2) for Cremonese at the 87th minute, taking the game to the extra time. The match ended up in a penalty shoot-out, with Afena-Gyan himself scoring the last attempt of his side and allowing Cremonese to qualify for the quarter-finals of the tournament.

International career 
On 4 November 2021, Afena-Gyan received his first call-up by the Ghana national team. However, he turned down the invitation for the Black Stars for the 2022 FIFA World Cup qualifiers against Ethiopia and South Africa. He revealed in an interview with Italian journalist, Gianluca Di Marzio that he felt the call-up was too early and that he wanted to concentrate on developing under José Mourinho at club level before accepting a call-up.

He debuted with Ghana in a 0–0 2022 FIFA World Cup qualification tie with Nigeria on 25 March 2022.

On 1 June 2022, Afena-Gyan scored his first international goal, as he contributed to the Black Stars' 3–0 win against Madagascar in the first match of the qualifiers to the 2023 Africa Cup of Nations: in the same occasion, he also provided the assist for Mohammed Kudus' opening goal.

Style of play 
Afena-Gyan is a quick striker who is able to play in different attacking positions. His pace is attributed to his involvement in athletics and being a 100m sprinter whilst in high school.

Personal life 
In February 2022, Afena-Gyan signed a sponsorship deal with German sportswear and equipment supplier Puma.

Career statistics

Club

International

Scores and results list Ghana's goal tally first, score column indicates score after each Afena-Gyan goal.

Honours 
Roma
 UEFA Europa Conference League: 2021–22
Individual

 Odartey Lamptey Future Star Award: 2022
 Calcio Trade Ball Most Promising Footballer: 2022

References

External links 
 
 

2003 births
Living people
People from Sunyani District
Ghanaian footballers
Ghana international footballers
Association football forwards
A.S. Roma players
U.S. Cremonese players
Serie A players
Ghanaian expatriate footballers
Ghanaian expatriate sportspeople in Italy
Expatriate footballers in Italy
UEFA Europa Conference League winning players